This is a list of films set on or around the American Thanksgiving holiday. It does not include Thanksgiving television specials.

Action
 Below Utopia (aka Body Count), a 1997 film starring Justin Theroux, Alyssa Milano, and Ice-T
 Spider-Man, a 2002 film directed by Sam Raimi

Animated
 B.C.: The First Thanksgiving, a 1973 cartoon special based on B.C.
 A Charlie Brown Thanksgiving, a 1973 cartoon special based on Peanuts
 A Doonesbury Special, a 1977 cartoon special based on Doonesbury
 Do or Diet a 1953 cartoon featuring Casper The Friendly Ghost                                                                                                                     
 Feedin' the Kiddie, a 1957 cartoon short featuring Tom and Jerry
 Free Birds, a 2013 film directed by Jimmy Hayward
 Holiday for Drumsticks, a 1949 Merrie Melodies cartoon short featuring Daffy Duck
 Jerky Turkey, a 1945 MGM Tex Avery cartoon short 
 The Little Orphan, a 1949 MGM cartoon short featuring Tom and Jerry
 Pilgrim Popeye, a 1951 Famous Studios cartoon short featuring Popeye
 Pilgrim Porky, a 1940 Looney Tunes cartoon short featuring Porky Pig
 Soup's On, a 1948 Walt Disney cartoon short featuring Donald Duck with Huey, Dewey, and Louie
 Tom Turk and Daffy, a 1944 Looney Tunes cartoon short featuring Daffy Duck and Porky Pig
 The Voice of the Turkey, a 1950 Noveltoons cartoon short

Comedy
 Addams Family Values, a 1993 film directed by Barry Sonnenfeld
 Alice's Restaurant, a 1969 film directed by Arthur Penn
 An Ache in Every Stake, a Three Stooges short film
 Awkward Thanksgiving, a 2014 film written and directed Henrique Couto
 Beethoven, a 1992 film directed by Brian Levant
 The Big Chill, a 1983 film directed by Lawrence Kasdan
 Broadway Danny Rose, a 1984 film written and directed by Woody Allen
 Diary of a Mad Housewife, a 1970 film directed by Frank Perry
 Down and Out in Beverly Hills, a 1986 film written and directed by Paul Mazursky
 Dutch, a 1991 film written by John Hughes and directed by Peter Faiman
 For Your Consideration, a 2006 film written and directed by Christopher Guest
 Friendsgiving, a 2018 film written and directed by Nicol Paone
 Funny People, a 2009 film cowritten and directed by Judd Apatow
 The Gold Rush, a 1924 film written by, directed by, and starring Charlie Chaplin
 Gone Fishin' (film), a film directed by Christopher Cain and written by J. J. Abrams and Jill Mazursky.
 Grumpy Old Men, a 1993 film directed by Donald Petrie
 Hanging Up, a 2000 film directed by and starring Diane Keaton
 Hannah and Her Sisters, a 1986 film written and directed by Woody Allen
 Home for the Holidays, a 1995 film directed by Jodie Foster 
 The House of Yes, a 1997 film directed by Mark Waters
 Instant Family, a 2018 American comedy-drama directed by Sean Anders
 Jack and Jill, a 2011 film directed by Dennis Dugan 
 Mistress America, a 2015 film directed by Noah Baumbach
 My Blue Heaven, a 1990 film directed by Herbert Ross
 National Lampoon's Thanksgiving Family Reunion, a 2003 television film directed by Neal Israel
 Nobody's Fool, a 1994 film directed by Robert Benton
 Not Cool, a 2014 film directed by Shane Dawson
 The Oath, a 2018 film directed by Ike Barinholtz
 The Object of My Affection, a 1998 film directed by Nicholas Hytner
 The Other Sister, a 1999 film directed by Garry Marshall
 Palo Alto, a 2007 film directed by Brad Leong
 Paul Blart Mall Cop, a 2009 film directed by Steve Carr 
 Pieces of April, a 2003 film written and directed by Peter Hedges 
 Planes, Trains and Automobiles, a 1987 film written, produced, and directed by John Hughes
 Primary Colors, a 1998 film directed by Mike Nichols
 The Prince & Me, a 2004 film directed by Martha Coolidge
 She's Gotta Have It, a 1986 film written and directed by Spike Lee
 Smart People, a 2008 film written by Mark Poirier and directed by Noam Murro
 Somebody Killed Her Husband, a 1978 comedy/mystery film directed by Lamont Johnson
 Son in Law, a 1993 film directed by Steve Rash
 The Star-Crossed Romance of Josephine Cosnowski, a 1985 television film written by Jean Shepherd and directed by Fred Barzyk
 Starting Over, a 1979 film directed by Alan J. Pakula
 Sweet Hearts Dance, a 1988 film directed by Robert Greenwald
 Tadpole, a 2002 American film directed by Gary Winick
 Thanksgiving, a 2014 film directed by Adam Newport-Berra
 Thanksgiving Day, a 1990 television film directed by Gino Tanasescu
 Tower Heist, a 2011 film directed by Brett Ratner
 What's Cooking?, a 2000 British American comedy-drama film directed by Gurinder Chadha
 You've Got Mail, a 1998 romantic comedy film starring Tom Hanks and Meg Ryan

Documentary
 The Last Waltz, a 1978 documentary film directed by Martin Scorsese about The Band's farewell concert, which took place on Thanksgiving Day in 1976

 American Movie, a 1999 documentary film directed by Chris Smith.

Drama
 American Gangster, a 2007 film directed by Ridley Scott
 American Son, a 2008 film directed by Neil Abramson
 Antwone Fisher, a 2002 film directed by and starring Denzel Washington
 Avalon, a 1990 film directed by Barry Levinson
 The Blind Side, a 2009 film directed by John Lee Hancock
 Brokeback Mountain, a 2005 film directed by Ang Lee
 Cast Away, a 2000 film directed by Robert Zemeckis
 The Daytrippers, a 1996 film directed by Greg Mottola
 The Doors, a 1991 biopic about Jim Morrison starring Val Kilmer
 Four Brothers, a 2005 film directed by John Singleton
 Giant, a 1956 film directed by George Stevens
 Home of the Brave, a 2006 film directed by Irwin Winkler
 The Humans, a 2021 film written and directed by Stephen Karam 
 The Ice Storm, a 1997 film directed by Ang Lee 
 The Morning After, a 1986 film directed by Sidney Lumet
 The Myth of Fingerprints, a 1997 film directed by Bart Freundlich
 One Special Night, a 1999 television film directed by Roger Young
 One True Thing, a 1998 film directed by Carl Franklin
 Palo Alto, a 2007 film written and directed by Brad Leong
 Plymouth Adventure, a 1952 film directed by Clarence Brown
 Prisoners, a 2013 film directed by Denis Villeneuve
 Rescue Dawn, a 2006 film directed by Werner Herzog
 Rocky, a 1976 film directed by John G. Avildsen, written by and starring Sylvester Stallone 
 Rocky II, a 1979 film written and directed by and starring Sylvester Stallone 
 Scent of a Woman, a 1992 film directed by Martin Brest 
 Still Alice, a 2014 film directed by Richard Glatzer and Wash Westmoreland
 Stuck in Love, a 2012 film written and directed by Josh Boone
 Sweet November, a 2001 film directed by Pat O'Connor
 Thanksgiving, a 2004 short film directed by Tom Donahue
 A Time to Remember, a 2003 television film directed by William Sims Myers
 Unfaithful, a 2002 film directed by Adrian Lyne
 Unhook the Stars, a 1996 film directed by Nick Cassavetes
 The Vicious Kind, a 2009 film directed by Lee Toland Krieger
 The War at Home, a 1996 film directed by and starring Emilio Estevez

Family
 A Family Thanksgiving, a 2010 Hallmark Channel Original Movie directed by Neill Fearnley
 Holiday Engagement, a 2011 Hallmark Channel Original Movie starring Bonnie Somerville and Shelley Long
 The Hoboken Chicken Emergency, a 1984 Television Movie based on the 1977 book
 Love at the Thanksgiving Day Parade, a 2012 Hallmark Channel Original Movie
 Miracle on 34th Street, a 1947 comedy-fantasy spanning from Thanksgiving to Christmas; remade for television in 1973 and theatrically in 1994
Molly's Pilgrim, a 1985 Oscar-winning short film
 The National Tree, a 2009 Hallmark Channel Original Movie starring Andrew McCarthy
 An Old Fashioned Thanksgiving, a 2008 Hallmark Channel Original Movie based on a short story by Louisa May Alcott
 The Santa Clause, a 1994 fantasy-comedy from Disney film spanning a year, with a scene in the latter half of the film set during Thanksgiving which helps kick off the film's final act
 Squanto: A Warrior's Tale, a 1994 Disney film based on the life of Squanto, featuring the first Thanksgiving in the final scene
 The Thanksgiving House, a 2013 Hallmark Channel Original Movie starring Emily Rose
 The Thanksgiving Promise, a 1986 TV film starring Beau Bridges
 The Thanksgiving Visitor, a 1967 TV adaptation of the story by Truman Capote
 Turkey Hollow, a 2015 film from Jim Henson Productions

Horror
 Alien Abduction: Incident in Lake County (1998), a family is terrorized by extraterrestrial creatures while celebrating Thanksgiving
 Blood Rage (1983), a psychopath goes on a homicidal rampage after the twin brother he framed for murder years earlier escapes on Thanksgiving
 Boogeyman (2005), around Thanksgiving, a man is stalked by the entity that haunted his childhood
 Christmas Evil (1980), a mentally unbalanced man believes himself to be Santa Claus, giving presents to children and punishing the "naughty" through violence; part of the film takes place at Thanksgiving
 Derelicts (2017), a dysfunctional family's Thanksgiving is interrupted when their home is invaded by a gang of sadistic drifters
 Escape Room (2019), a withdrawn student is challenged by a professor to do something that scares her over Thanksgiving break
Ghost Note (2017), the ghost of a blues musician terrorizes childhood friends who have reunited over Thanksgiving weekend
Home Movie (2008), home video footage documents a family's descent into violence and madness; includes scenes of various holidays including Thanksgiving
 Home Sweet Home (1981), an escaped mental patient embarks on a killing spree over Thanksgiving weekend
 Intensity (1997), a young woman encounters a serial killer while visiting a friend's family for Thanksgiving, then follows him to try and rescue a teenager he's abducted
 Kristy (2014), a college girl who is alone on campus over the Thanksgiving break is targeted by a group of outcasts
 The Last Thanksgiving (2020), a family of cannibals kill people who don't celebrate Thanksgiving
 Séance (2006), a group of college students left alone in their dorm over Thanksgiving weekend decide to hold a séance
 Thanksgiving (2006; short film), two couples are taken captive and tortured by a sadist during Thanksgiving dinner
 Thanksgiving (2007; short film), an insane, turkey-obsessed pilgrim commits a series of random murders on Thanksgiving; directed by Eli Roth
 ThanksKilling (2009), a group of students are hunted by a demonic turkey during Thanksgiving break
 ThanksKilling 3, a 2012 film sequel to ThanksKilling
 ThanXgiving (2006), a college film student, Spectre, who takes his film crew to a deserted campground to finish his thesis film over Thanksgiving break, gets terrorized by cannibal serial killers

Musical
 By the Light of the Silvery Moon, a 1953 film directed by David Butler
 Holiday Inn, a 1942 film directed by Mark Sandrich
The Wiz, a 1978 film directed by Sidney Lumet and starring Diana Ross

Thriller
 The Morning After, a 1986 film directed by Sidney Lumet and starring Jane Fonda
 Don't Say a Word, a 2001 film directed by Gary Fleder
 Prisoners, a 2013 film directed by Denis Villeneuve
 Traitor, a 2008 film directed by Jeffrey Nachmanoff about a terrorist attack planned for Thanksgiving Day
 Unknown, a 2011 film directed by Jaume Collet-Serra

See also
 List of Thanksgiving television specials

References

External links
 List of Thanksgiving Feature Films and Videos at the Internet Movie Database

Lists of films set around holidays
 
Thanksgiving-related lists